Richard Alan Greenberg (January 21, 1947 – June 16, 2018) was an American designer of special effects and main titles for feature films.  He was nominated for the Academy Award for Best Visual Effects for his work in Predator (1987).  He was also nominated for the BAFTA Award for Best Special Visual Effects for his work in Zelig (1983).  He also directed the 1989 feature film Little Monsters.

Early life and education
Greenberg was born in Chicago and raised in West Rogers Park.  He graduated from Sullivan High School.  He earned a bachelor’s degree in industrial design and a master’s degree in graphics design, both from the University of Illinois Urbana-Champaign.

Personal life and death
His marriage to Paula Silver ended in divorce.

Greenberg died at the age of 71 of appendicitis in New York City on June 16, 2018.  He was survived by his brother, Robert, his sister, Carol Felsenthal, and his three children: Luke, Morgan and Jessica Silver-Greenberg.

Filmography

References

External links
 

American film directors
1947 births
2018 deaths
Special effects people
University of Illinois Urbana-Champaign alumni